Jean-Paul de Jong (born 17 October 1970) is a Dutch former professional footballer who played mostly as a right midfielder. He was most recently the manager of Roda JC Kerkrade. He was the manager of FC Utrecht until 4 September 2018.

He is best known for his lengthy spell as a player with FC Utrecht, appearing in nearly 450 official games in 14 years and winning two major titles.

Career
Born in Utrecht, de Jong had several trainee spells, including with country giants Feyenoord and AFC Ajax. He made his professional debuts in Germany at the age of 20 with 2. Bundesliga club VfL Osnabrück, appearing sparingly over the course of two seasons.

In 1993 de Jong returned to his country and city, going on serve a 14-year spell with FC Utrecht. In total he played 370 Eredivisie matches, in which he scored 11 goals; as the side appeared in three consecutive domestic cup finals, winning twice, "Mr. FC Utrecht" (as he was nicknamed) was on target in the final of the 2002–03 edition, opening the scoresheet in a 4–1 win against Feyenoord.
 
On 22 April 2007, de Jong received his 83rd yellow card in the league, surpassing the record number of cards received by a player which had been previously held by Barry van Galen. During his final season as a player, in which he contributed with 21 matches to a comfortable ninth place, he completed his coaching training badges and began to work as a youth trainer with the club.

Honours
KNVB Cup: 2002–03, 2003–04
Johan Cruyff Shield: 2004

References

External links
Stats at Voetbal International 
Beijen profile 

1970 births
Living people
Footballers from Utrecht (city)
Dutch footballers
Association football midfielders
Eredivisie players
USV Elinkwijk players
FC Utrecht players
2. Bundesliga players
VfL Osnabrück players
Dutch football managers
FC Eindhoven managers
Dutch expatriate footballers
Expatriate footballers in Germany
Dutch expatriate sportspeople in Germany
Association football coaches